The Asbury Park Sea Urchins were a minor league baseball team based in Asbury Park, New Jersey in 1914. The Asbury Park team previously played as members of the 1897 New Jersey State League before the Urchins played a partial season as members of the 1914 Atlantic League.

History
Minor league baseball play began in Asbury Park, New Jersey in 1897, when the Asbury Park team played as members of the 1897 New Jersey State League. The league was a four–team Class D level league. The New Jersey State League was formed with teams in Atlantic City, New Jersey, Bridgeton, New Jersey and Millville, New Jersey joining Asbury Park as charter members.

After beginning play on April 14, 1897, the New Jersey State League season ended on June 1, 1897. The player statistics and team standings from the 1897 league are unknown, Asbury Park included. One source lists the teams in the order of: Bridgeton, Millville, Asbury Park and Atlantic City, but without records to align with the order.
The New Jersey State League permanently folded after the 1897 season.

Minor league baseball returned in 1914, with Asbury Park gaining a team during the season. The Asbury Park Sea Urchins began play after joining the 1914 Atlantic League during the season. The 1914 Atlantic League was an eight–team Class D level minor league baseball league. The league had been known as the New York–New Jersey League a season earlier. The Atlantic League president was Rosslyn M. Cox, who would later serve as the mayor of Middletown, New York. The league began play on May 20, 1914, and concluded the season with Asbury Park as a member on September 7, 1914.

On July 2, 1914, Asbury Park reestablished a team when the Bloomfield–Long Branch Cubans of Bloomfield, New Jersey and Long Branch, New Jersey relocated and finished the season as the Asbury Park "Sea Urchins". Bloomfield–Long Branch was 15–22 when they relocated to Asbury Park. The team ended the season with an overall record of 30–59, finishing 31.0 games behind the 1st place Poughkeepsie Honey Bugs and in 8th place in the eight–team league. The managers were Andy Coakley and Sam Jaeger. Twin brothers Joe Shannon and Maurice Red Shannon made their professional debuts playing for the Asbury Park Sea Urchins under assumed names (Maurice and Joe O'Brien) in 1914, doing so to protect their college eligibility at Seton Hall College. The Poughkeepsie Honey Bugs finished in 1st place with a record of 65–31 and there was no postseason. The Atlantic League had financial difficulties and folded before it could play the 1915 season.

Asbury Park, New Jersey has not hosted another minor league team.

The ballpark
The name and location of the Asbury Park home minor league ballpark in 1897 and 1914 is unknown. The New York Yankees later held spring training in Asbury Park in 1943 en route to winning the 1943 World Series. The Yankees utilized the baseball facilities at Asbury Park High School (seating capacity was 7,500) and stayed at the Albion Hotel in Asbury Park.

Timeline

Year–by–year record

Notable alumni
Andy Coakley (1914, MGR)
Joe Shannon (1914)
Red Shannon (1914)

See also
Asbury Park Sea Urchins players

References

External links
Baseball Reference

Defunct minor league baseball teams
Baseball teams established in 1914
Baseball teams disestablished in 1914
Asbury Park, New Jersey
Monmouth County, New Jersey
Defunct baseball teams in New Jersey
1914 establishments in New Jersey
1914 disestablishments in New Jersey